The English School of Kyrenia is a school in Northern Cyprus.

The Prep and Pre-Prep School opened in September 2008. For the academic year 2008-9, the school was housed in a historical building located next to the Archive Offices near the centre of Kyrenia.  The new buildings for both primary and secondary pupils was planned to open in September 2009.

The school curriculum is taught in both Turkish and English. Classes in English aim to enable pupils to gain fluency as a first or second language. There is also a tutor who teaches Turkish formally to the older children regularly throughout the week. By the end of the pre-prep school the aim is for pupils to be able to converse comfortably in both languages. 

In the Pre-Prep school the children follow the Early Years Foundation Stage curriculum. As they move to the Prep classes they transfer to the Cambridge International Primary programme supported by the British national curriculum.  The Senior School curriculum from September 2009 will prepare for entrance to universities in Europe, including the UK, and North America, through the International Baccalaureate programme.

External links

Educational institutions established in 2008
Schools in Northern Cyprus
Organisations based in Northern Cyprus
2008 establishments in Northern Cyprus
Kyrenia
English-language education